The Farnsworth Invention is a stage play by Aaron Sorkin adapted from an unproduced screenplay about Philo Farnsworth's first fully functional and completely all-electronic television system and David Sarnoff, the RCA president who stole the design.

Screenplay 

On April 29, 2004, New Line Cinema announced they had acquired the drama script The Farnsworth Invention from award-winning writer Aaron Sorkin. Thomas Schlamme was set to direct.

The release read in part: "The Farnsworth Invention tells the story of Philo Farnsworth, a boy genius born in Beaver, Utah, who later moved to Rigby, Idaho, where he began experimenting with electricity. In 1920, when Farnsworth was 14, he showed his high school chemistry teacher a design he had made for an electronic television only to become involved in an all or nothing battle with David Sarnoff, the young president of RCA and America's first communications mogul." Schlamme described the movie as "a classic American tale driven by the conflict between a Mormon farmer and a Russian immigrant over the ownership of the most influential invention of the 20th Century."

Following its initial press release, New Line did not disclose any additional information about the film. As a result, websites such as the Internet Movie Database incorrectly anticipated a film in 2005. IMDb eventually removed the entry.

Stage play 

In 2005 it was announced that Sorkin was adapting the screenplay for the stage and the play would debut in the Abbey Theatre in Dublin, Ireland. It was staged at the La Jolla Playhouse from February 20 - March 25, 2007 as "a page-to-stage production" with Jimmi Simpson (Zodiac) playing Farnsworth and Stephen Lang (Gods and Generals, Avatar) as Sarnoff. Award-winning composer Andrew Lippa penned 45 minutes of music to underscore the drama.

It was scheduled to open on Broadway on November 14, 2007, but this was delayed due to the 2007 Broadway stagehand strike.  It opened at the Music Box Theatre on December 3, 2007, with Hank Azaria in the Sarnoff role due to Lang's commitment to James Cameron's 2009 film Avatar. The show closed on March 2, 2008. Simpson was honored with a Theatre World Award for his performance.

An Australian production directed by Louise Fischer officially opened on July 13, 2011 at the New Theatre in Newtown.

Historical accuracy 

The play is not historically accurate, and is an intentional alteration of the story. It shows Farnsworth as being defeated legally by Sarnoff, and then spending his life in obscurity. In reality, Farnsworth won the lawsuit, later received a $1 million payment from RCA for the purchase of his TV patents, and went on to have an illustrious career in technological research. There is a statue of Farnsworth in Statuary Hall in the U.S. Capitol.

This issue was later addressed on a Facebook question where Sorkin wrote:

Critical reception 

In The New York Times, Ben Brantley panned the play with faint praise:

In the New York Post, Clive Barnes awarded it 2½ out of 4 stars and stated, "Sorkin's take on the Farnsworth/Sarnoff standoff would be better suited to a screen, either big or small. Even now, while crackling with crisp dialogue, The Farnsworth Invention often has the air of a clumsy stage adaptation of, say, Citizen Kane."

Joe Dziemianowicz of the New York Daily News described it as "disappointing and ho-hum" and "seldom deeply involving . . . Scenes play out like brief vignettes from a History Channel biopic  . . . without stirring emotions."

In Newsday, Linda Winer called it "vintage Sorkin and crackling prime-time theater . . . breezy and shrewd, smart-alecky and idealistic."

In Variety, David Rooney said, "The plot-heavy drama is light on fully fleshed-out characters or subtext, making it likely to play more satisfyingly when it inevitably reverts to being a film or cable project . . . [it] never fully moves beyond its stream of over-explained factoids."

In the Chicago Sun-Times, Hedy Weiss described it as "a firecracker of a play in a fittingly snap, crackle and pop production under the direction of Des McAnuff, the drama has among its many virtues the ability to make you think at the same time that it breaks your heart."  

Chris Jones of the Chicago Tribune called it "slick yet deeply conflicted" and "restless" and added, "this is one of those Boomer-friendly, media-savvy, self-aware pieces of effective theater that feel like they owe a lot to TV writing and our celebrity-obsessed culture . . . this is a jumpy piece of writing. It feels like the writer is worried the audience might change the channel. That's not entirely a bad thing. As fans of Sorkin's TV shows know well, the internal psyche of Sorkin is a very stimulating place in which to dwell for a couple of hours. His characters are uncommonly articulate and witty—albeit without much differentiation. He has mastered all the dramatic rules so well, he can titillate you by deconstructing and then reassembling them. And in this case he certainly knows how to make a dry scientific quest into a provocative piece of theater."

Further reading

References

External links 
: The Real Tragedy of 'The Farnsworth Invention' 
 
 See the official trailer for "The Farnsworth Invention"
  The Farnsworth Invention: Fact -v- Fiction
 
 Farnsworth Archives
 PBS American Experience Documentary : Big Dream, Small Screen

2007 plays
Broadway plays
Plays based on actual events
Plays by Aaron Sorkin
Plays set in the United States
Idaho in fiction